Yemeni Sign Language is the (or a) deaf sign language of Yemen. It belongs to the Arab sign-language family (Hendriks 2008). It is not clear how close are the sign languages of the two former Yemeni states.

References

Hendriks, Bernadet, 2008. Jordanian Sign Language: aspects of grammar from a cross-linguistic perspective (dissertation)

Arab sign languages
Languages of Yemen